Borden House may refer to:

Borden House (Prairie Grove, Arkansas), listed on the NRHP in Washington County, Arkansas
Borden-Winslow House, Fall River, Massachusetts, listed on the NRHP in Massachusetts
Ariadne J. and Mary A. Borden House, Fall River, Massachusetts, listed on the NRHP in Massachusetts
Borden-Pond House, Worcester, Massachusetts, listed on the NRHP in Massachusetts

See also
Borden Farm (disambiguation)